Tiggy may refer to:

Tiggy (Charlotte Vigel), a Danish musician
Tiggy Legge-Bourke (1965–), royal nanny
Tiggy the talking cat, see Talking animal#Cats
Tig Trager, a fictional Sons of Anarchy character
Tiggy (geometry), the Bowers abbreviation for a truncated great icosahedron
Tiggy, another name for Tag (game)
Tiggy, a book by Miss Read